"Under the Double Eagle", Op. 159, is an 1893 march composed by J. F. Wagner, an Austrian military music composer. The title is a reference to the double eagle in the coat of arms of Austria-Hungary.

It was published in the United States in 1902 by Eclipse Publishing Co., a branch of Joseph Morris Music in Philadelphia, Pennsylvania.

This piece is in E-flat major, though the Trio is in A-flat major. It is written in ternary form. 

In 1935, Bill Boyd and His Cowboy Ramblers, with an arrangement by Mort Glickman on Bluebird Records, was second only to the Carter Family in the top Hillbilly (Country) music  hits of the year. It became a Western swing standard, and has been recorded by many Country and Bluegrass artists since.

The tune was parodied in the Benny Goodman recording "Benjie's Bubble" and was also used for the well-known Monty Python's Flying Circus animation segment "Conrad Poohs And His Dancing Teeth".

References

Further reading
Crew, Danny O. Presidential Sheet Music: An Illustrated Catalogue of Published Music Associated with the American Presidency and Those Who Sought the Office. Jefferson, North Carolina: McFarland, 2001.  

Songs about birds
1893 songs
1935 singles
Austrian military marches
Compositions by Josef Wagner